The Florida stone crab (Menippe mercenaria) is a crab found in the western North Atlantic, from Connecticut to Colombia, including Texas, the Gulf of Mexico, Belize, Mexico Jamaica, Cuba, The Bahamas, and the East Coast of the United States. The crab can also be found in and around the salt marshes of South Carolina and Georgia. It is widely caught for food. The closely related species Menippe adina (gulf stone crab) is sometimes considered a subspecies – they can interbreed, forming hybrids – and they are treated as one species for commercial fishing, with their ranges partly overlapping. The two species are believed to have diverged approximately 3 million years ago.

Description
They are brownish red with gray spots and a tan underside, and have large and unequally sized chelae (claws) with black tips. In addition to the usual sexual dimorphism exhibited by crabs, the female Florida stone crabs have a larger carapace than males of a similar age, and males generally have larger chelae than females.

Eating habits
Florida stone crabs prefer to feed on oysters and other small mollusks, polychaete worms, and other crustaceans. They will also occasionally eat seagrass and carrion. Predators that feed on stone crabs include horse conch, grouper, sea turtles, cobia, and octopuses.

Habitats
Oftentimes the hole will have shells around the opening; the crab uses the shell as a digging tool for the hole construction.

Reproduction
Females reach sexual maturity at about two years of age. Their long spawning season lasts all spring and summer, during which time females produce up to a million eggs. The larvae go through six stages in about four weeks before emerging as juvenile crabs. Their lifespan is seven to eight years. The male Florida stone crab must wait for the female to molt her exoskeleton before they can mate. After mating, the male will stay to help protect the female for several hours to several days. The female will spawn four to six times each season.

Molting

The Florida stone crab loses its limbs easily to escape from predators or tight spaces, but their limbs will grow back. When a claw is broken such that the diaphragm at the body/claw joint is left intact, the wound will quickly heal itself and very little blood is lost. If, however, the claw is broken in the wrong place, more blood is lost and the crab's chances of survival are much lower. Each time the crab molts, the new claw grows larger.

The crab only molts at night or in night-like conditions due to the crab being extremely vulnerable to predators without the protection of its shell.  If the crab is becoming too large for its shell and the sun is up, the crab releases a hormone from a gland located on one of its eye stalks called the x-organ. This hormone prevents the crab from molting from its shell until it finds a safe place to molt or it has become dark enough outside to molt in safety.

Fishery

The Florida stone crab is usually fished near jetties, oyster reefs or other rocky areas, just as for blue crabs. The bodies of these crabs are relatively small and so are rarely eaten, but the claws (chelae), which are large and strong enough to break an oyster's shell, are considered a delicacy. Harvesting is accomplished by removing one or both claws from the live animal and returning it to the ocean where it can regrow the lost limb(s).

In 1978, and in the Everglades National Park Research Center, wild caught crabs were kept in an aquarium for the specifics of testing mortality rates of declawed crabs. Mortality rates of 47 percent for doubly declawed and 28 percent for single declawed crabs were evident. In the 2011 season the mortality rates had increased to 62.9 percent and 40.8 percent respectively. In retrospect, 20 percent of landed claws are regrown.

In the United States, Florida stone crabs are legal for harvest from October 15 until May 15. The catch varies from year to year, ranging between 2.0 and 3.5 million in the period 1982–2009, overwhelmingly from the Gulf coast (as opposed to Atlantic coast). This is believed to be the maximum amount possible, given current environmental conditions, regulations, and practices. The number of traps tripled between 1989–1990 and 2009–2010 without haul increasing (hence having a very low catch-per-trap level). However, due to fisheries management, the haul is believed to be stable, as sufficient spawning happens.

Claws are sold by size, generally in four sizes: medium, large, jumbo, and colossal.

The top buyer of stone crab claws is Joe's Stone Crab in Miami, and it plays a significant role in the industry, influencing the wholesale price and financing many crabbers. The Monterey Bay Aquarium has given the Floridian stone crab fishery its highest rating of "Best Choice" for maintaining high fishing standards and working hard to keep the stone crab a viable fishery.

See also
 Declawing of crabs

References

Further reading
 Stone Crabs , Fish and Wildlife Research Institute, Florida Fish and Wildlife Conservation Commission.

External links

 

Eriphioidea
Edible crustaceans
Commercial crustaceans
Crabs of the Atlantic Ocean
Crustaceans described in 1818